Shi Yanjue (born April 1956) is a Chinese Buddhist monk and the current president of the Buddhist Association of China, succeeding Shi Xuecheng, who accused of sexual harassment.

Biography
Shi Yanjue was born in Gangu County, Gansu, in April 1956. In January 1982, he took refuge in the Three Jewels under Shi Changhui at Xiangji Temple in Xi'an, Shaanxi.

In June 2004, he became vice-president of the Buddhist Library of China. On November 5, 2006, he was proposed as the new abbot of Guangji Temple. In 2015 he was vice-president of the Buddhist Association of China. In May 2016, he received an honorary doctorate in Philosophy in Buddhist Studies from the Mahachulalongkornrajavidyalaya University. In August 2018, he was named acting president of the Buddhist Association of China, replacing Shi Xuecheng. On December 2, 2020, he was elected president of the Buddhist Association of China at the 10th National Congress of the Buddhist Association of China.

References

External links
  Biography of Shi Yanjue on chinabuddhism.com.cn

1956 births
People from Tianshui
Living people
People's Republic of China Buddhist monks
Chan Buddhist monks